Beauty Mountain Wilderness is a U.S. wilderness area in Riverside County, California. It is part of the Palm Springs - South Coast Field Office of the Bureau of Land Management, and was created by the Omnibus Public Land Management Act of 2009 from land already managed by the Bureau of Land Management.

Camping is allowed in the Wilderness Area, but only for 14 days. After this time, campers must move their site at least  from the previous site. Pets are also allowed, but must be kept "under control". Any motorized vehicles are not allowed on Wilderness land.

See also
List of U.S. Wilderness Areas

References

External links
 

IUCN Category Ib
Protected areas of Riverside County, California
Wilderness areas of California
Bureau of Land Management areas in California
Protected areas established in 2009